Steffi Graf was the defending champion and won in the final 6–3, 6–2 against Helena Suková.

Seeds
A champion seed is indicated in bold text while text in italics indicates the round in which that seed was eliminated. The top eight seeds received a bye to the second round.

  Steffi Graf (champion)
  Helena Suková (final)
  Claudia Kohde-Kilsch (semifinals)
  Hana Mandlíková (third round)
  Raffaella Reggi (second round)
  Sandra Cecchini (quarterfinals)
  Sylvia Hanika (semifinals)
  Mary Joe Fernández (quarterfinals)
  Arantxa Sánchez (second round)
  Nathalie Tauziat (second round)
  Isabel Cueto (third round)
  Patricia Tarabini (third round)
  Jana Novotná (first round)
  Kathleen Horvath (second round)
 n/a
 n/a

Draw

Finals

Top half

Section 1

Section 2

Bottom half

Section 3

Section 4

References
 1988 WTA German Open Draw

WTA German Open
1988 WTA Tour